Friedrich Wilhelm German Mäurer (11 February 1811, Bensberg – 7 July 1883, Paris) was a German Communist writer and leader of the early German labor movement. He joined the League of Outlaws ("Bund der Geächteten) because of his democratic beliefs. When the League of Outlaws became the League of the Just ("Bund der Gerechtigkeit"), Mäurer became a member of the League of the Just. He wrote poetry for its newsletters and several books, and with Moses Hess was an important link between it and Karl Marx.

References

1811 births
1883 deaths
German revolutionaries
German socialists
German male poets
19th-century poets
19th-century German writers
19th-century German male writers